The University Teachers Association of Ghana (UTAG) is a professional association for university teachers in Ghana that helps in bargaining for the welfare of lecturers across all public universities in Ghana.

History 
It was formed in 1964 to cater for the needs and well-being of members. The body was formerly known as Ghana Association of University Teachers (GAUT), formed by the then expatriate senior members during the 1964/1965 academic year. It organized film shows, musical, dance and theatre performances to entertain members at weekends.

In 1973, the name Ghana Association of University Teachers (GAUT) was changed to University Teachers Association of Ghana (UTAG) by senior members namely R.G. Baeta, John Hyde and Yeboah Amankwah which was purposely to clarify and change the whole conception of the association.

Governing body 
The spine of UTAG contains the president, vice president, national secretary and 15 national executives from each of the public universities. The current executives of the association are  Associate Professor Solomon Nunoo, president: ric N. Wiah, vice president, Asare Asante-Annor, secretary and Akyene Tetteh, treasurer.

2022 strike

References 

Education-related professional associations
Professional associations based in Ghana